Deep Run is a tributary of South River in Middlesex County, New Jersey in the United States.

References

Rivers of New Jersey
Rivers of Middlesex County, New Jersey